Kutara is a leafhopper genus belonging to the subfamily Deltocephalinae. It was previously assigned to the Selenocephalinae subfamily.

References

Cicadellidae genera